First-seeded Shirley Fry defeated Althea Gibson 6–3, 6–4 in the final to win the women's singles tennis title at the 1956 U.S. National Championships.

Seeds
The seeded players are listed below. Shirley Fry is the champion; others show in brackets the round in which they were eliminated.

  Shirley Fry (champion)
  Althea Gibson (finalist)
  Louise Brough (quarterfinals)
  Dorothy Knode (quarterfinals)
  Margaret duPont (quarterfinals)
  Shirley Bloomer (semifinals)
  Betty Pratt (semifinals)
  Darlene Hard (quarterfinals)

Draw

Key
 Q = Qualifier
 WC = Wild card
 LL = Lucky loser
 r = Retired

Final eight

References

1956
1956 in women's tennis
1956 in American women's sports
Women's Singles